Jennifer Joanne Metcalfe (born 4 September 1983) is an English actress. She is best known for her roles of Jade Nicholls in Emmerdale and  Mercedes McQueen in the Channel 4 soap opera Hollyoaks, which she has appeared in since 2006. Her portrayal of the character has led to her reprising the role in the programme's spin-off series Hollyoaks Later between 2008 and 2020. She appeared as a contestant in the sixth series of Dancing on Ice in 2011, where she finished in tenth place.

Early life
Metcalfe was born in Bradford, West Yorkshire and grew up on the Holme Wood housing estate. She attended the Scala Kids drama school in her hometown. In between acting jobs, Metcalfe worked as a fitness instructor in Bradford.

Career
In her early roles, Metcalfe appeared in several television programmes, including the children's television series My Parents Are Aliens and the ITV dramas Where The Heart Is, At Home with the Braithwaites and soap opera Emmerdale.

Metcalfe's breakthrough role occurred in 2006, when she was cast as Mercedes McQueen in the Channel 4 soap opera Hollyoaks. She had previously been considered for the role of Claire Devine before her character was created. Metcalfe was the first actress to be cast in the soap by executive producer Bryan Kirkwood.

Her role in Hollyoaks has led to her appearing in its late-night spin-off series Hollyoaks Later, first appearing in the first series in 2008. It was announced in April 2010 that she would return to the series for its third series later that year, and continued to reprise the role for series 4 and series 5. Despite the show concluding in 2013, a one-off special was broadcast in 2020, with Metcalfe returning, once again in a main role.

On 19 December 2010, it was announced Metcalfe would take part in the sixth series of ITV winter sports competition Dancing on Ice. She was partnered with Sylvain Longchambon and was the seventh celebrity eliminated from the competition, when she finished in the bottom two of the leaderboard along with fellow contestant Vanilla Ice, who was saved by the judging panel.

Metcalfe quit Hollyoaks in August 2014. Her character appeared to have been killed off, departing on 18 November; unexpectedly, Metcalfe made a brief return in February 2015, where her character was revealed to be alive, with it confirmed that she would be returning on a permanent basis.

Personal life
Metcalfe confirmed her first pregnancy in February 2017 to former Geordie Shore star Greg Lake. She gave birth to a son on 20 June 2017, whom she named Daye Colmic Lake. Metcalfe and Lake split in 2020.

She co-owns the clothing rental boutique, The Closet, in Liverpool with Hollyoaks co-stars Claire Cooper and Leah Hackett, which opened in April 2010.

Filmography

Awards and nominations

References

External links

 
 

1983 births
Living people
Actresses from Bradford
English television actresses
English soap opera actresses
Association footballers' wives and girlfriends